The Provincial Competitiveness Index (PCI) in Vietnam is designed to assess and rank the performance, capacity and willingness of provincial governments to develop business-friendly regulatory environments for private sector development. The fourth iteration, PCI 2008, once again validates that economic governance does matter. At each level of initial conditions, better-governed provinces are able to not only use their endowments more efficiently but also influence business performance and income in subsequent years.

The PCI is the result of a major, ongoing collaborative effort between the Vietnam Chamber of Commerce and Industry (VCCI) and the U.S. Agency for International Development(USAID)-funded Vietnam Competitiveness Initiative (VNCI), managed by DAI, with a substantial contribution by VNCI partner The Asia Foundation (TAF).

The PCI has its origins in an earlier study by the Asia Foundation (TAF) and VCCI. This study, titled “Best Practices in Provincial Economic Governance” was undertaken in 2003-2004 and covered 14 non-metropolitan provinces. Although based upon a different methodology, the PCI used the same survey instrument as that developed for the TAF-VCCI study.

Edmund Malesky of the University of California - San Diego led the development of the PCI's research methodology and authored the presentation of its analytical findings.

VNCI and VCCI are planning to jointly produce the PCI on an annual basis. This will allow provinces to track their progress over time, not only in terms of relative rankings, but also in terms of absolute scores.

Rank

References

External links
 Official website

Economy of Vietnam